The Kuliev Cavalry Group was a cavalry formation of the Red Army during World War II.

It was formed in mid July 1941 under the command of the 21st Cavalry Division's commander.

The group operated as a raiding force on the southern flank of the German penetration at Smolensk.  It spent most of July and August in the Rostov area, usually under the direct control of Army Group Kachalov during the Battle of Smolensk.  When 2nd Panzer Group turned south into the flank and rear of the Southwestern Theater it went right through the group staging area.  The group retreated and was disbanded in September.

Composition 
 21st Mountain Cavalry Division
 52nd Cavalry Division

References 

See also Cavalry corps (Red Army)

Cavalry corps of the Soviet Union